Emblemaria vitta, the Ribbon blenny, is a species of chaenopsid blenny found around Navassa Island, in the western central Atlantic ocean. It is known to reach a length of  SL.

Etymology 
The species name "vitta" (meaning "band" in Latin) references the ribbon shape of the blenny's orbital cirri.

References

vitta
Fish described in 2002
Fauna of Haiti
Fish of the Caribbean